The Wickremesinghe cabinet is the current central government of Sri Lanka led by President Ranil Wickremesinghe. It was formed on 22 July 2022, following the resignation of Wickremesinghe's predecessor, Gotabaya Rajapaksa.

Cabinet members
Ministers appointed under article 43(1) of the constitution. The members of the cabinet is as follows:

State ministers
Ministers appointed under article 44(1) of the constitution.

Notes

References

Cabinet of Sri Lanka
Cabinets established in 2022
2022 establishments in Sri Lanka
Current governments
Cabinet